Novella is a comune in Trentino, a province of the northern Italian region Trentino-Alto Adige/Südtirol. It was established on 1 January 2020 after the fusion of the five municipalities of Brez, Cagnò, Cloz, Revò and Romallo.

References

External links 
 Official website